The 1984 Laurence Olivier Awards were presented by the Society of London Theatre on 8 December 1984 at the Theatre Royal, Drury Lane in London, celebrating excellence in West End theatre. It was broadcast by BBC Television, though the broadcast date and specific BBC station is not availablethe 2003 Oliviers, for example, aired on BBC Two the evening after the live event.

After the first eight years (1976–1983) as the Society of West End Theatre Awards, these were the first awards to be held after Laurence Olivier consented to the awards being renamed in his honour.

Winners and nominees
Details of winners (in bold) and nominees, in each award category, per the Society of London Theatre.

{| class=wikitable style="width="100%"
|-
! width="50%" | Play of the Year
! width="50%" | Musical of the Year
|-
| valign="top" |
 Benefactors by Michael Frayn – Vaudeville Master Harold and the Boys by Athol Fugard – National Theatre Cottesloe
 Poppie Nongena by Elsa Joubert and Sandra Kotze, adapted by Hilary Blecher – Donmar Warehouse
 Rat in the Skull by Ron Hutchinson – Royal Court
| valign="top" |
 42nd Street – Theatre Royal Drury Lane Pump Boys and Dinettes – Piccadilly
 Starlight Express – Apollo Victoria
 The Hired Man – Astoria
|-
! colspan=1| Comedy of the Year
|-
|
 Up 'n' Under by John Godber – Donmar Warehouse Gymslip Vicar by Cliff Hanger – Donmar Warehouse
 Intimate Exchanges by Alan Ayckbourn – Ambassadors
 Two into One by Ray Cooney – Shaftesbury
|-
! style="width="50%" | Actor of the Year in a New Play
! style="width="50%" | Actress of the Year in a New Play
|-
| valign="top" |
 Brian Cox as Detective Inspector Nelson in Rat in the Skull – Royal Court Ian Charleson as Eddie in Fool for Love – National Theatre Cottesloe
 John Kani as Willie in Master Harold and the Boys – National Theatre Cottesloe
 Michael Pennington as Strider in Strider: The Story of a Horse – National Theatre Cottesloe
| valign="top" |
 Thuli Dumakude as Poppie Nongena in Poppie Nongena – Donmar Warehouse Brenda Blethyn as Sheila in Benefactors – Vaudeville
 Julie Covington as Vivienne Haigh-Wood Eliot in Tom and Viv – Royal Court
 Julie Walters as May in Fool for Love – National Theatre Cottesloe
|-
! style="width="50%" | Actor of the Year in a Revival
! style="width="50%" | Actress of the Year in a Revival
|-
| valign="top" |
 Ian McKellen as Mikhail Platonov in Wild Honey – National Theatre Lyttelton Miles Anderson as Sigismund in Life Is a Dream – RSC at The Pit
 Emrys James as Sir Giles Overreach in A New Way to Pay Old Debts – RSC at the Barbican Pit
 Peter McEnery as Baron De Laubardemont in The Devils – RSC at the Barbican Pit
| valign="top" |
 Vanessa Redgrave as Miss Tina in The Aspern Papers – Theatre Royal Haymarket Glenda Jackson as Nina Leeds in Strange Interlude – Duke of York's
 Juliet Stevenson as Isabella in Measure for Measure – RSC at the Barbican
 Zoë Wanamaker as Viola in Twelfth Night – RSC at the Barbican
|-
! style="width="50%" | Actor of the Year in a Musical
! style="width="50%" | Actress of the Year in a Musical
|-
| valign="top" |
 Paul Clarkson as John Tallentire in The Hired Man – Astoria Tim Flavin as Phil "Junior" Dolan III in On Your Toes – Palace
 David Kernan as The Lord Chancellor in The Ratepayers' Iolanthe – Phoenix
 Lon Satton as Rambling Poppa McCoy in Starlight Express – Apollo Victoria
| valign="top" |
 Natalia Makarova as Vera Barnova in On Your Toes – Palace
 Julia Hills as Emily Tallentire in The Hired Man – Astoria
 Clare Leach as Peggy Sawyer in 42nd Street – Theatre Royal Drury Lane
 Sheila White as Belle Poitrine in Little Me – Prince of Wales
|-
! colspan=1| Comedy Performance of the Year
|-
|
 Maureen Lipman as Miss Skillon in See How They Run – Shaftesbury
 Lavinia Bertram as Various in Intimate Exchanges – Ambassadors
 Leonard Rossiter as Inspector Truscott in Loot – Ambassadors
 Michael Williams as George in Two into One – Shaftesbury
|-
! style="width="50%" | Actor of the Year in a Supporting Role
! style="width="50%" | Actress of the Year in a Supporting Role
|-
| valign="top" |
 Edward Petherbridge as Charles Marsden in Strange Interlude – Duke of York's
 Ramolao Makhene as Sam in Master Harold and the Boys – National Theatre Cottesloe
 Richard O'Callaghan as Feste in Twelfth Night – RSC at the Barbican
 Timothy Spall Dauphin Charles in Saint Joan – National Theatre Olivier
| valign="top" |
 Marcia Warren as Vera in Stepping Out – Duke of York's
 Clare Higgins as Stella Kowalski in A Streetcar Named Desire – Mermaid
 Sophia Mgcina as Poppie's Mother in Poppie Nongena – RSC at the Barbican Pit
 Zoë Wanamaker as Kitty Duval in The Time of Your Life – Lyric
|-
! colspan=1| Most Promising Newcomer of the Year in Theatre
|-
|
 Tim Flavin as Phil "Junior" Dolan III in On Your Toes – Palace
 Hilary Blecher, Elsa Joubert and Sandra Kotze for adapting, conceiving and directing Poppie Nongena – Donmar Warehouse 
 Henry Goodman as Dromio of Ephesus in The Comedy of Errors – RSC at the Barbican
 Clare Leach as Peggy Sawyer in 42nd Street – Theatre Royal Drury Lane
|-
! colspan=1| Director of the Year
|-
|
 Christopher Morahan for Wild Honey – National Theatre Lyttelton
 John Barton for Life Is a Dream – RSC at the Barbican Pit 
 Michael Blakemore for Benefactors – Vaudeville
 Adrian Noble for The Comedy of Errors – RSC at the Barbican
|-
! colspan=1| Designer of the Year
|-
|
 John Gunter for Wild Honey – National Theatre Lyttelton
 Voytek Dolinski and Michael Levine for Strange Interlude – Duke of York's
 John Napier for Starlight Express – Apollo Victoria
 Carl Toms for The Aspern Papers – Theatre Royal Haymarket 
|-
! colspan=1| Outstanding Achievement of the Year in a Musical
|-
|
 Ned Sherrin for conceiving The Ratepayers' Iolanthe – Phoenix
 Howard Goodall for scoring The Hired Man – Astoria
 John Napier for set designing Starlight Express – Apollo Victoria
 Starlight Express for the overall impact of the production – Apollo Victoria
|-
! style="width="50%" | Outstanding Individual Performance of the Year in a New Dance Production
! style="width="50%" | Outstanding New Dance Production of the Year
|-
| valign="top" |
 David Bintley in Petrushka, Sadler's Wells Royal Ballet – Sadler's Wells
 Wayne Eagling in Different Drummer, The Royal Ballet – Royal Opera House
 Patricia Ruanne in Onegin, London Festival Ballet – London Coliseum
| valign="top" |
 Giselle, Dance Theatre of Harlem – London Coliseum Consort Lessons, The Royal Ballet – Royal Opera House
 Intimate Pages, Ballet Rambert – Sadler's Wells
 Metamorphosis, Sadler's Wells Royal Ballet – Sadler's Wells
|-
! style="width="50%" | Outstanding Individual Performance of the Year in a New Opera Production
! style="width="50%" | Outstanding New Opera Production of the Year
|-
| valign="top" |
 Philip Langridge in Osud, English National Opera – London Coliseum Edita Gruberová in I Capuleti e i Montecchi, The Royal Opera – Royal Opera House
 Valerie Masterson in Mireille, English National Opera – London Coliseum
 Rosalind Plowright in Sicilian Vespers, English National Opera – London Coliseum
| valign="top" |
 From the House of the Dead, Welsh National Opera La Calisto, London Sinfonietta and Opera Factory
 Sicilian Vespers, English National Opera – London Coliseum
 The Rape of Lucretia, English National Opera – London Coliseum
|-
! colspan=1| Society Special Award
|-
|
 Arnold Goodman'|}

Productions with multiple nominations and awards
The following 18 productions, including one opera, received multiple nominations:

 5: Starlight Express 4: Poppie Nongena, The Hired Man 3: 42nd Street, Benefactors, Master Harold and the Boys, On Your Toes, Strange Interlude and Wild Honey 2: Fool for Love, Intimate Exchanges, Life Is a Dream, Rat in the Skull, Sicilian Vespers, The Aspern Papers, The Comedy of Errors, The Ratepayers' Iolanthe, Twelfth Night and Two into OneThe following two productions received multiple awards:

 3: Wild Honey 2: On Your Toes''

See also
 38th Tony Awards

References

External links
 Previous Olivier Winners – 1984

Laurence Olivier Awards ceremonies
Laurence Olivier Awards, 1984
Laurence Olivier Awards
1984 theatre awards